William Robert Barnes (22 May 1890 – 27 January 1964) was an Australian rules footballer who played for the Richmond Football Club in the Victorian Football League (VFL).

Notes

External links 

1890 births
1964 deaths
Australian rules footballers from Victoria (Australia)
Richmond Football Club players